The Shadows No. 3 was an extended play 45 rpm record released in 1961 by The Shadows. It was released on Columbia Records/EMI Records as SEG 8166 in mono and reached #13 in the UK EP charts in August 1962.  The cover picture is the same as The Shadows album cover.

All the songs on the record had previously been released on the album The Shadows, and more songs from the album had already been released on the EP The Shadows No. 2.  There appears never to have been a The Shadows No. 1.

Track listing
Side 1
 "All My Sorrows"  (Dave Guard, Bob Shane, Nick Reynolds)
 "Stand Up and Say That!"  (Hank Marvin)

Side 2
 "Gonzales"  (Robyn McGlynn)
 "Big Boy"  (Bruce Welch, Marvin)

Robyn McGlynn, the author of "Gonzales" was a pseudonym of Peter Gormley whose daughter was named Robyn.

The liner notes were written by Cliff Richard.

Personnel 
 Hank Marvin – Lead Guitar, vocals
 Bruce Welch – Rhythm guitar
 Tony Meehan – Drums
 Jet Harris – Bass guitar
 Norrie Paramor - Recording manager

1961 EPs
The Shadows EPs
EMI Columbia Records EPs